Cardarelli is an Italian surname. Notable people with the surname include:

Amos Cardarelli (born 1930), Italian footballer
Antonio Cardarelli (1831–1927), Italian physician
Cardarelli's sign
Joe Cardarelli (1944–1994), American poet
Vincenzo Cardarelli (1887–1959), Italian journalist, writer and poet

Italian-language surnames